Paul Nicholas Whelan (born March 5, 1970) is a Canadian-born former United States Marine with U.S., British, Irish, and Canadian citizenship. He was arrested in Russia on December 28, 2018, and accused of spying. On June 15, 2020, he received a 16-year prison sentence.

Early life
Whelan was born on March 5, 1970, in Ottawa, Ontario, Canada, to British parents with Irish heritage.

Career
According to a deposition Whelan gave in 2013, he was in law enforcement from 1988 to 2000 as a police officer in Chelsea, Michigan, and a sheriff's deputy in Washtenaw County. The Chelsea Police, however, said he worked in lesser roles and as a part-time officer from 1990 to 1996, while the Washtenaw County sheriff reported no record of his employment. A former colleague said he was a patrol officer from 1998 to 2000 in the Keego Harbor police department.

He was an IT manager for the Kelly Services staffing company from 2001 to 2003, and then 2008 to 2010. From 2010 to 2016 Whelan was Kelly Services' senior manager of global security and operations.

He enlisted in the Marine Corps Reserve in 1994. He took military leave from Kelly Services to serve with the Marine Corps Reserve from 2003 to 2008, including service in Iraq. He held the rank of staff sergeant with Marine Air Control Group 38 working as an administrative clerk and administrative chief, and he was part of Operation Iraqi Freedom. After a court-martial conviction in January 2008 on multiple counts "related to larceny", he was sentenced to 60 days restriction, reduction to pay grade E-4, and a bad conduct discharge. The specific charges against him included "attempted larceny, three specifications of dereliction of duty, making a false official statement, wrongfully using another's social security number, and ten specifications of making and uttering checks without having sufficient funds in his account for payment."

When arrested in Russia, Whelan was director of global security and investigations for BorgWarner, an international automotive parts manufacturer based in Michigan. His work with Kelly Services and BorgWarner gave Whelan contacts with the U.S. intelligence community, federal agents and foreign embassies.

Whelan traveled to Russia several times from 2006 and maintained an intermittent presence on a Russian language social media website, Vkontakte (VK), where he had approximately 70 contacts. He has studied Russian but communicated online using Google Translate. Whelan supported Donald Trump in the 2016 U.S. presidential election; following Trump's victory, he posted in Russian Президент Трyмп Вперед!! ("President Trump Onward!!").

He said in a deposition in 2013 that he holds a bachelor's degree in criminal justice and an MBA degree. He took courses at Northern Michigan University from fall 1988 to fall 1990 without earning a degree.

Arrest in Russia
On December 28, 2018, Whelan was arrested in the Moscow area by Russia's Federal Security Service (FSB), which later confirmed his arrest. Whelan's twin brother David said Whelan arrived in Moscow on December 22 to attend the wedding of a former fellow Marine at the  Hotel Metropol Moscow and to assist the groom's family members on their first visit to Russia, a country he had visited many times. He said his brother planned to return to Michigan on January 6, 2019, via Saint Petersburg.

Per MBK News, an outlet run by Putin critic Mikhail Khodorkovsky, Whelan had $80,000 in cash "temporarily confiscated" during a customs inspection at Domodedovo Airport. David said his brother entered Russia using his U.S. passport. He said his brother had not been in contact with his family. He was formally charged on January 3, 2019.

According to the Russian news agency , Whelan was apprehended in his hotel room at the Metropol Hotel while concluding a long outing with a Russian citizen, who handed him a USB drive containing "a list of all the employees at a classified security agency". The independent Latvian-based publication Meduza reported that the wedding attendees all banded close together for the duration of the holiday, and were taken aback by Whelan's decision to spend the day alone.

The BBC cited family members of Whelan, who said he previously bragged about knowing an agent of the FSB, and was privy to an unusual cache of personal details about his friend, including which intelligence training school he attended (biographical information typically reserved for a very close circle).

According to Whelan, his long-time friend had appeared unexpectedly in the hotel, followed by authorities, who later arrested him. According to attorneys for Whelan, they could not provide the name of Whelan's Russian friend due to Russian secrecy rules, but Whelan's family identified the person as Ilya Yatsenko, whom the Russian newspaper Kommersant described as a major in the FSB's Department "K", which monitors Russian economic crimes.

Whelan was being held in Moscow's Lefortovo Prison. As of March 2019, he shared a cell with another prisoner who spoke no English.

Former CIA officers have stated that the CIA would not recruit an officer with Whelan's military record, nor leave an officer exposed without a diplomatic passport. They further claim that Whelan's arrest is connected to tensions between Russia and the United States, including the detention of confessed unregistered foreign agent Maria Butina. On December 20, 2018, when discussing Butina's arrest, Russian President Vladimir Putin stated that Russia "will not arrest innocent people simply to exchange them".

U.S. Ambassador to Russia Jon Huntsman Jr. met with Whelan on January 2, 2019, while Whelan was in Russian custody. He told Whelan's family that Paul was "in good health and good spirits", but that the family needed to supply all his incidental needs aside from basic foodstuffs. U.S. Secretary of State Mike Pompeo said: "We've made clear to the Russians our expectation that we will learn more about the charges, come to understand what it is he's been accused of and if the detention is not appropriate, we will demand his immediate return." On January 4, 2019, British Foreign Secretary Jeremy Hunt said: "We don't agree with individuals being used in diplomatic chess games... We are all extremely worried about him and his family." As of January 4, British and Irish consular officials were seeking access to Whelan.

On January 3, 2019, Whelan's attorney, Vladimir Zherebenko, said he was seeking his release on bail. He said a trial would not begin for at least six months, and that he would welcome an exchange of Whelan for Butina. He said: "I presume that he is innocent because, for now, I haven't seen any evidence against him that would prove otherwise." A few weeks later, Zherebenkov said Whelan had been unaware of the contents of the USB drive and believed it contained material solely of personal value such as "photographs, videos, anything at all, about his previous holiday in Russia."

On January 5, 2019, the Russian Foreign Ministry said that on the day after Whelan's arrest the United States had detained a Russian citizen, Dmitry Makarenko, in the Northern Marianas and transported him to Florida to face charges of unauthorized export of defense equipment.

Conviction and sentencing
On June 15, 2020, Whelan was convicted and sentenced to 16 years in a Russian prison for espionage by a court in Moscow. His lawyers said they believed Russia would now seek a prisoner swap. Whelan said in court that the case was a sham to use him to influence the United States: "We have proven my innocence... we have proven fabrication. This is slimy, greasy corrupt Russian politics, nothing more, nothing less."

Whelan was initially held at the Correctional Colony No. 18 under supervision of the Russian Federation's Federal Penitentiary Service.  he was held in a high-security prison, IK-17, eight hours drive southeast of Moscow.

Campaign to release 
Family members said Whelan had been told that he had been arrested to be exchanged for a Russian prisoner in the United States, mentioning Konstantin Yaroshenko (who was released in return for American Trevor Reed), Viktor Bout, or Roman Seleznev. On July 27, 2022, it was announced that President Joe Biden had offered a trade for Whelan and WNBA player Brittney Griner, who was arrested in Russia in February on drug charges, in exchange for convicted arms dealer Viktor Bout, nicknamed "The Merchant of Death". The Russian side insisted on the additional release of Vadim Krasikov, an assassin serving a life sentence for murder in Germany. After negotiations, only Griner was exchanged for Bout on December 8, 2022, as the Kremlin had refused to release Whelan and posed an ultimatum to the Biden administration of freeing Griner or no one.

Whelan's brother David Whelan approved of the decision to "make the deal that was possible, rather than waiting for one that wasn't going to happen."

Personal life
Whelan is a citizen of Canada, the United States, the United Kingdom, and Ireland. His twin brother David ascribed Paul's acquisition of the multiple nationalities to "probably a genealogical interest as much as anything."

Whelan was born in Ottawa, Ontario, Canada, and raised partly in the Ann Arbor area of Michigan where he and his twin brother David graduated from Huron High School in 1988. David said the family had not known Paul had a bad conduct discharge. In addition to his twin brother, Paul Whelan has a brother, Andrew, and a sister, Elizabeth.

Whelan lived in Novi, Michigan, prior to detainment in Russia.

See also
 Nicholas Daniloff
 Russia–United States relations

Notes

References

External links
 Deposition, January 18, 2013

1970 births
American people convicted of spying for the United States
Living people
Military personnel from Ottawa
American police officers
Chief security officers
United States Marines
Canadian emigrants to the United States
Canadian people of British descent
Canadian people of Irish descent
American people of British descent
American people of Irish descent
People with acquired American citizenship
People with acquired British citizenship
People with acquired Irish citizenship
Canadian twins
American twins
American people imprisoned in Russia
People with multiple nationality